Alexander G. Abanov is an American physicist working in the field of theoretical Condensed matter physics. He received his Ph.D from The University of Chicago in 1997. He is currently professor of physics at Stony Brook University. He was elected as Fellow of the American Physical Society in 2016.

References

Year of birth missing (living people)
Living people
Stony Brook University faculty
Fellows of the American Physical Society
21st-century American physicists
University of Chicago alumni